Jay Aston (born 14 February 1988) is a Papua New Guinea International rugby league footballer who played at the 2008 World Cup and the 2009 Pacific Cup. Primarily playing as a hooker, Aston played for the Melbourne Storm in the National Youth Competition in 2008, before joining the Northern Pride in 2009.

Background
Jay Aston was born in Brisbane, Queensland, Australia.

References

1988 births
Living people
Australian rugby league players
Northern Pride RLFC players
Norths Devils players
Papua New Guinea national rugby league team players
People educated at Brisbane State High School
Rugby league hookers
Rugby league players from Brisbane